Long Lake is a lake in Florence County and Forest County, in the U.S. state of Wisconsin. Long Lake is a 3478 acre lake located in Washburn County. It has a maximum depth of 74 feet.

Long Lake was so named from the fact it is longer than it is wide, and longer than the other nearby lakes.

See also
List of lakes in Wisconsin

References

Lakes of Florence County, Wisconsin
Lakes of Forest County, Wisconsin